Sajjad Ali (born 3 February 1990) is a Pakistani cricketer. He made his List A debut for Habib Bank Limited in the 2018–19 Quaid-e-Azam One Day Cup on 30 September 2018. He made his first-class debut for Habib Bank Limited in the 2018–19 Quaid-e-Azam Trophy on 3 October 2018.

References

External links
 

1990 births
Living people
Pakistani cricketers
Habib Bank Limited cricketers